The PeopleMover is an urban mass transit PeopleMover system attraction in Tomorrowland in the Magic Kingdom at the Walt Disney World Resort in Bay Lake, Florida just outside of Orlando, Florida. Designed as an urban mass-transit system of the future, vehicles take passengers on a grand circle tour of the realm of Tomorrowland that provides elevated views of several other attractions. It is also the lone remaining attraction in the Magic Kingdom to have a corporate sponsor.

Ride experience

The attraction has a single station, which resides in the center of Rocket Tower Plaza and beneath the Astro Orbiter. Passing the queue, passengers step onto the Speedramp (inclined moving walkway) to the second level. They then step onto the moving platform which matches the speed of the PeopleMover trains, and board before they depart the station.

Leaving the Rocket Tower Plaza Station, the trains make a sharp left turn, followed by a sweeping turn over the plaza. The track then makes a right-hand turn, running along the outside of the northern show building and above the former queue for Stitch's Great Escape! and passing by the Tomorrowland main entrance at Central Plaza. The track enters a tunnel through the northern show building and passes a large diorama containing a portion of the Progress City/"Epcot" model, which originally resided in the upper level of the Carousel of Progress at the New York World's Fair of 1964-1965 and at Disneyland starting in 1967-1973, before encountering a diorama of several robots and crossing the Star Traders shop.

Leaving the northern show building, the T.T.A. passes the Tomorrowland Speedway and TRON Lightcycle/Run. Afterwards, the T.T.A. crosses the Walt Disney World Railroad tracks and pass through a switch, which leads to the ride's storage and maintenance bays as they make a right turn to enter Space Mountain. Inside Space Mountain, the trains then make a left turn and pass in between the lift hills of the roller coaster tracks. The vehicles then pass two lighted signs reading "Starport: Seven Five" (an oblique reference to the opening year of the attraction), before open space to the left allows a view down into the post-show. After the view of the post-show, the track makes a right turn, wrapping around the Omega track's loading station, and travels along the back side of the dome, which is in complete pitch black darkness. It is possible to look up and see the projections from the ride and the tracks. The trains exit, merging with the storage track, and run along the outside of the dome to return to the railroad bridge. The Space Mountain segment of the TTA has gained heavy notoriety among park guests for offering the only accessible view of Space Mountain when the dome's interior work lights are on. Because the two attractions have separate operating systems, the TTA does not have to stop during Space Mountain breakdowns, so guests riding the TTA when the work lights are on get a rare illuminated look at the roller coaster tracks.

After crossing the railroad tracks again, the trains backtrack to a point above the Tomorrowland Speedway before turning south. After passing over Space Mountain's entrance plaza, the former Skyway terminal and the restrooms, the track travels along the exterior of Walt Disney's Carousel of Progress, before crossing over the former Galaxy Palace Theater entrance and entering the south show building. Entering the building, guests pass a diorama of a futuristic salon and then get a view down into Buzz Lightyear's Space Ranger Spin, similar to the one given of Star Traders. Exiting the tunnel, the ride travels along the side of the south show building, and passing by Main Street U.S.A., the Tomorrowland sign entrance and the Cinderella Castle again, and above the queue line for Monsters, Inc. Laugh Floor, and the queue line for Buzz Lightyear's Space Ranger Spin. The ride then returns to Rocket Tower Plaza, where guests disembark and unload.

History

Wedway PeopleMover (1975–1994)

 
The Wedway PeopleMover opened on July 1, 1975, based on the PeopleMover attraction at Disneyland in California (WED for Walter Elias Disney). Because the system did not utilize the rotating Goodyear tires used as propulsion in the initial version of the transportation mode, instead relying on Linear induction motors, Goodyear had no involvement in the East Coast version. 

The Edison Electric Institute was the original institutional patron of the attraction. Instead of an open track with covered cars, as designed for Disneyland, the trains were designed were built as open-air cars with that traveled under a permanent roof over the guideway. 

The engineering and design of the track, itself, were also reworked; while Disneyland's version regularly changed elevation, especially during the outdoor portions, the version for Walt Disney World would remain at the same elevation entirely.

The original narration was provided by longtime Disney announcer, Jack Wagner. In June 1985, his narration was replaced by the voice of ORAC One – "The Commuter Computer" voiced by actor Ronnie Schell, which was used until June 11, 1994, when the attraction received a makeover for the New Tomorrowland. At that time the WEDWay Peoplemover passed through the attractions that occupied Tomorrowland during that time, including Mission to Mars, If You Had Wings, and others. Originally, the tunnel through the south show building (now home to Buzz Lightyear's Space Ranger Spin) had three windows; one and two on the trains' right, three to the trains' left. This building first housed If You Had Wings, and the windows were carefully placed to look down into the Mexico, Jamaica, and Trinidad show scenes in such a way as to hide all projectors, lights and other show support equipment. When If You Had Wings (renamed If You Could Fly) was closed in January 1989 and remodeled into Delta Dreamflight, the windows no longer lined up correctly with show scenes. The first window was replaced with backlit panels depicting the ride's barnstormer scene. Window two looked into the Parisian Excursion scene, from a viewpoint which heavily distorted the tableau's forced perspective. The third window would have had riders looking directly into an extremely bright light and so was completely obscured with plywood and black fabric.

Tomorrowland Transit Authority (1994–2009)

In the spring of 1994, Tomorrowland underwent a massive refurbishment that changed the theme of the land from being a showcase of future technology to a working city of the future. The WEDway PeopleMover received new physical theming as the track structure along the north and south show buildings as well as Rocket Tower Plaza was updated from smooth Googie-esque white forms to boldly colored metallic structures. The section of track linking the north show building to Space Mountain, and the section from Space Mountain to the Carousel of Progress, which was not changed.
 
It was during this refurbishment that the attraction's name changed from the Wedway PeopleMover to Tomorrowland Transit Authority. A new narration was added, with the tour led by Pete Renaday broadcasting from TTA Central. The new name and narration debuted on June 12, 1994. This 1994 recording remained largely unaltered until October 2, 2009, which came shortly after the ride had reopened following a five-month down period during the refurbishment of Space Mountain.

The TTA's backstory in the 1994–2009 version of the ride made reference to the Transit Authority's three different "lines": the Blue Line, the Red Line, and the Green Line. The Blue Line, which constitutes the actual ride, was Tomorrowland's intra-city elevated train system. The Red Line took riders 'off-planet' to other destinations in the galaxy, while the Green Line provided local transportation to Tomorrowland's "Hover-Burbs." There was a diorama of a hub station where all three lines intersect located on the second floor of the north show building (Interplanetary Convention Center). Other services provided by the Transit Authority (interstate highway maintenance and long-distance space travel) were alluded to in the ride's narration.

Changes made in the 1994 narration over its 15 years of use included the following:
The replacement of the narration for the south show building in 1996 when Delta Dreamflight became Take Flight. This narration was replaced again when Take Flight was turned into Buzz Lightyear's Space Ranger Spin in 1998.
The 1994 narration for Space Mountain said, "Now arriving in Space Mountain, Tomorrowland's gateway to the Galaxy, Presented by Federal Express," noting Space Mountain's sponsorship by FedEx. When FedEx dropped sponsorship in 2004, the narration was altered to cut off after "Galaxy."
A narration was played upon leaving the south show building tunnel mentioning The Timekeeper from 1994 to 2006 when The Timekeeper closed, wherein the narration on the TTA mentioning it was removed.

Tomorrowland Transit Authority PeopleMover (2009–2022)
The Tomorrowland Transit Authority closed on April 19, 2009, in line with a major refurbishment of Space Mountain, and reopened on September 12, 2009. The closure was necessary due to extensive construction work planned for the roller coaster, and the inherent safety risks such activity would pose to Transit Authority riders.

During the refurbishment, the beamway was enhanced with new multicolored LED lighting that moves in time with the music being played in Tomorrowland. Other enhancements included freshly re-painted trackway and infrastructure, as well as new speakers for the ride audio system.

On October 2, 2009, the ride received a new narration featuring the voice of Mike Brassell, with safety spiels provided by B. J. Ward, who provided the main narration for Disneyland's PeopleMover from 1982 to 1995. The new narration is similar to the original WEDway Peoplemover narration and includes segments introducing all attractions in Tomorrowland, including attractions that had opened after the last update to the narration, such as Buzz Lightyear's Space Ranger Spin and the Monsters, Inc. Laugh Floor. The narration also includes brief audio clips from characters represented by the various attractions: Buzz Lightyear can be heard when passing Buzz Lightyear's Space Ranger Spin, Roz is heard when passing Monsters, Inc. Laugh Floor, Mickey Mouse can be heard when passing above the Mickey's Star Traders store before the rebranding to Star Traders in 2019, and Stitch, also known as "Experiment 626", was previously heard when passing Stitch's Great Escape!. In addition, a female voice paging for Mr. Tom Morrow can be heard shortly after traveling past the lift hill in Space Mountain, which in the 1994 narration happened over Carousel of Progress. The PeopleMover name was revived in the new narration, which refers to the attraction vehicle as the "Tomorrowland Transit Authority PeopleMover," in place of the previous "TTA Metroliner" name introduced after the attraction's 1994 refurbishment.

As the TTA reopened while Space Mountain's refurbishment was still underway, a temporary spiel was played inside Space Mountain that went, 

On August 5, 2010, it was announced that the name "PeopleMover" would officially be re-instated into the ride's name, effectively changing it to Tomorrowland Transit Authority PeopleMover. Ride signage was changed around the track to reflect the name change.

On March 12, 2020, it was announced that Tomorrowland Transit Authority PeopleMover would close for refurbishment. 

On October 26, 2020, since Walt Disney World reopened after being temporarily closed during the ongoing COVID-19 pandemic, Walt Disney World announced that they once again extended the Tomorrowland PeopleMover refurbishment. The refurbishment continues to follow along with the theme park hours posted the furthest into the future, in this case April 4, 2021. On March 31, 2021, Walt Disney World announced yet another extension to the PeopleMover refurbishment, this time set to reopen May 2021. The ride soft-opened on April 25, 2021, and officially reopened the next day.

PeopleMover (2022–present)
On July 1, 2022, the narration was updated to feature an entirely new narration by ORAC-5 (a reference to the original narrator character of ORAC One), replacing the narration done by Mike Brassell. The safety spiel was also updated to make references to aliens and other sci-fi tropes. While much of the dialogue is still the same, just with a new voice, the narration now features references to past iterations of the PeopleMover's narration, as well as references to defunct rides and attractions from Tomorrowland's history, such as If You Had Wings, The Timekeeper, and the song "The Best Time of Your Life" from the 1975 version of The Carousel of Progress. The three-note musical chime heard throughout the 1994-2009 narration has also been restored. There is also new narration referencing the upcoming Tron Lightcycle Run. References to Stitch have been removed, as has the cameo by Monster Inc.'s Roz, with only Buzz Lightyear's cameo remaining.

See also

Magic Kingdom attraction and entertainment history
Omnimover
Rail transport in Walt Disney Parks and Resorts
Subway (George Bush Intercontinental Airport)

Notes

References

External links

1975 establishments in Florida
Amusement rides introduced in 1975
Magic Kingdom
People mover systems in the United States
Rail transport in Walt Disney Parks and Resorts
Railroads of amusement parks in the United States
Tomorrowland
Walt Disney Parks and Resorts attractions
WEDway people movers